This is a list of notable footballers who have played for Borussia Mönchengladbach. Generally, this means players that have played a lot of matches for the club.

List

Key
 GK: Goalkeeper
 DF:  Defender
 MF: Midfielder
 ST: Striker

References
 Statistics at official club website 
 Borussia Mönchengladbach at fussballdaten.de 

Players

Borussia Monchengladbach
Association football player non-biographical articles